Pachystruthio is a genus of extinct bird which lived in Eurasia from the Late Pliocene to the Middle Pleistocene. Its fossils have been found in Hungary, the Crimea, Georgia, and China. The genus contains three species: P. pannonicus (the type species), P. dmanisensis, and P. transcaucasicus, which were all formerly placed with the ostrich genus, Struthio. An incomplete femur from the Nihewan Formation (China) has been assigned to Pachystruthio indet. P. dmanisensis has been estimated standing 3.5 meters (11.5 feet) tall and weighing up to 450 kg (990 lb), making it much larger than the modern ostrich and one of the largest known birds.

Although Pachystruthio is known as the giant ostrich, its relationship to the extant ostriches of the genus Struthio is not clear.this bird along with the either herbivorous or omnivorous or possibly carnivorous Gastornis is one of if not the largest birds ever to exist in Europe. It would have fed like a ostrich. Pachystruthio likely didn’t have many predators although bears like urus maritimus tyrannus and big cats like cave lions would have been a occasional threat.

References

 
 
 

Birds described in 1954
Extinct flightless birds
Fossil taxa described in 1954
Neogene birds of Asia
Pleistocene birds
Pleistocene species extinctions
Pliocene birds
Prehistoric birds of Europe
Quaternary birds of Asia
Struthionidae